Veszpremi may refer to:

Patrick Veszpremi (born 1989), Australian rules footballer
FC Veszprém, Hungarian football club